The LIV Golf Invitational Bedminster is a professional golf tournament that was held in Bedminster, New Jersey, outside of New York City. The tournament was held in July 2022, at Trump National Golf Club Bedminster and was the third event for LIV Golf, a new golf series led by Greg Norman and funded by the Saudi Arabian Public Investment Fund.

Format
The tournament was a 54-hole individual stroke play event, with a team element. Four man teams were selected via a draft by their designated team captains, with a set number of their total scores counting for the team on each day. Each round commenced with a shotgun start, with the leaders beginning on the first hole for the final round, in order to finish on the eighteenth.

Inaugural field
The field for the inaugural event was announced on July 19.  45 of the 48 players were named, with the remaining three to be confirmed. The following day they were confirmed as Henrik Stenson (who had been relieved from his position as captain of the European Ryder Cup team earlier in the day), Jason Kokrak and Charles Howell III.

Abraham Ancer
Richard Bland
Laurie Canter
Paul Casey
Eugenio Chacarra
Bryson DeChambeau (c)
Hennie du Plessis
Sergio García (c)
Talor Gooch
Branden Grace
Justin Harding
Sam Horsfield
Charles Howell III
Yuki Inamori
Dustin Johnson (c)
Matt Jones
Sadom Kaewkanjana
Martin Kaymer (c)
Phachara Khongwatmai
Ryosuke Kinoshita
Brooks Koepka (c)
Chase Koepka
Jason Kokrak
Jinichiro Kozuma
Graeme McDowell
Phil Mickelson (c)
Jediah Morgan
Kevin Na (c)
Shaun Norris
Louis Oosthuizen (c)
Wade Ormsby (c)
Carlos Ortiz
Pat Perez
Turk Pettit
James Piot
Ian Poulter
David Puig (a)
Patrick Reed
Charl Schwartzel
Travis Smyth
Henrik Stenson
Hudson Swafford (c)
Hideto Tanihara (c)
Peter Uihlein
Scott Vincent
Lee Westwood (c)
Bernd Wiesberger
Matthew Wolff

Teams
4 Aces GC: Johnson (c), Reed, Gooch, Perez
Cleeks GC: Kaymer (c), McDowell, Canter, Puig (a)
Crusher GC: DeChambeau (c), Casey, Howell III, Norris
Fireball GC: García (c), Ancer, Ortiz, Chacarra
HY Flyers GC: Mickelson (c), Wiesberger, Wolff, Harding
Iron Heads GC: Na (c), Kaewkanjana, Khongwatmai, Vincent
Majesticks GC: Westwood (c), Poulter, Stenson, Horsfield
Niblicks GC: Swafford (c), Uihlein, Piot, Pettit
Punch GC: Ormsby (c), Jones, Smyth, Morgan
Smash GC: B. Koepka (c), Kokrak, Bland, C. Koepka
Stinger GC: Oosthuizen (c), Schwartzel, Grace, Du Plessis
Torque GC: Tanihara (c), Kinoshita, Inamori, Kozuma

Winners

Individual

Team

Notes

References

Bedminster
Golf tournaments in the United States
July 2022 sports events in the United States